The Archaeanactids (Greek: Αρχαιανακτίδαι) were a Greek dynasty of the Kingdom of Bosporus that ruled in 480–438 BC.

The presumed founder, Archaeanax, was probably a strategos of a league of city-states in the Cimmerian Bosporus, likely formed as a defense against foreign threats. After taking power, Archaeanax caused the cities of Theodosia and Nymphaeum to withdraw from the league. Throughout their reign, Panticapaeum and her surrounding cities had an age of economic growth as well as the construction of new temples and replanning of all city parts. They were later succeeded by a hellenized family of Thracians, called the Spartocids.

References 

480 BC
Ancient Greek dynasties
Monarchs of the Bosporan Kingdom
5th-century BC establishments
5th-century BC disestablishments